Adventure Pinball: Forgotten Island is a pinball video game released in 2001 by Electronic Arts for Microsoft Windows.

Gameplay
 The game uses the Unreal Engine which was previously only used for first-person shooter games. The game is rendered in 3-D and has both a story mode consisting of 9 levels, where no actual pinball tables exist and a table mode. Most of the levels must be unlocked by completing other levels. There are hidden areas in the story mode to earn bonus points, and they also feature power-ups to help the player progress throughout the game.

Rather than the standard pinball format, players were able to roam around a small world known as "The Forgotten Island". It also featured monsters and insects to eliminate or bypass while playing in story mode.

In addition to the instruction manual, a booklet is provided with the Windows version of the game that includes a short story in the appearance of the main character's personal journal.

Levels
The levels for story mode and table mode are the same, but the difference is that story mode offers quests and objectives to unlock new levels for both story mode and table mode, as opposed to table mode which is used to set a high score for each level.

Development
The game went gold on March 5, 2001.

Reception

Adventure Pinball: Forgotten Island received "mixed" reviews according to the review aggregation website Metacritic. Trey Walker of GameSpot said, "While it has its faults, it is for the most part successful in adding first-person shooter flash to a traditional kind of game." Vincent Lopez of IGN said, "It's one of the few times where I would have liked less levels, with more quality construction." However, Jeff Lundrigan of NextGen said that the game "wants to be a lot more than just a pinball game, but while it offers something beyond the usual pinball gameplay, it also just doesn't handle the basics of pinball gameplay very well."

References

External links
Official Site

2001 video games
Electronic Arts games
Pinball video games
Unreal Engine games
Video games developed in Canada
Windows games
Windows-only games
Cancelled PlayStation 2 games
Multiplayer and single-player video games
Prehistoric people in popular culture
Dinosaurs in video games
Video games set in prehistory